The reverse bungee (also known as catapult bungee, slingshot, or ejection seat) is a modern type of fairground ride that was invented by Troy Griffin in c. 1978. The ride grew a following and is now one of the best known rides. Many installations also utilize a reverse-mounted camera that records passengers during their experience, typically available for purchase after completing the attraction.

Reverse bungee rides operate at amusement parks and as stand-alone attractions. Due to the limited capacity of the attraction, most installations are an upcharge and require a separate admission from their respective park.

Reverse bungee rides are manufactured by several different companies. One of the most prominent is the SlingShot ride from Funtime of Austria.

Skyscreamer
The ride consists of two telescopic gantry towers mounted on a platform, feeding two elastic ropes down to a two-person passenger car constructed from an open sphere of tubular steel. The passenger car is secured to the platform with an electro-magnetic latch as the elastic ropes are stretched.

The passenger sphere is free to rotate between the two ropes, giving the riders a chaotic and disorienting ride. After several bounces, the ropes are relaxed and the passengers are lowered back to the launch position.

Slingshot

The Slingshot manufactured by Funtime uses steel cables and a patented spring propulsion device rather than elastic ropes.

Installations

Safety and possible injury
In August 1998, Jérôme Charron died in a reverse bungee ride accident at the Ottawa Exhibition in Ottawa, Ontario, Canada when he was hurled 40 m into the air before plummeting to his death as his harness had detached. In February 2000, the firm responsible for the ride, Anderson Ventures, was fined $145,000 for this incident.

Ordinarily, the bungee cord is changed to adjust the body weight of different riders. The operator in Ottawa instead used a lead between the carabiner and the bungee cord for this purpose. Using a lead is faster than changing the cord, so more rides can be offered; however, using a lead is less safe than switching bungee cords. The problem occurs when the lead cord wraps around the carabiner, tightens and through friction undoes the twisting safety mechanism that keeps the carabiner locked. In this case, the operator was using dual carabiners. On the bounce back up, the lead cord tightened, causing both carabiners to open. This fact was discovered by the Ottawa Police who investigated the death. A video of the incident depicts it.
 
Provincial inspectors had inspected the ride just 4 days before the incident and approved it, but did not see the lead because it was in a nearby box.

References

External links

 Amusement Ride Extravaganza
 Sling Shot

Amusement rides
Bungee jumping
Articles containing video clips